Bubs may refer to:

 The musical group the Beelzebubs
 The character "Bubs" from Homestar Runner.
 The character "Bubbles" from The Wire, who is also sometimes addressed as Bubbs
 The character "Bubbles" from Trailer Park Boys